"Blazed and Confused" is the seventh episode of the twenty-sixth season of the American animated television series The Simpsons, and 559th episode in the series. Originally broadcast on the Fox network in the United States on November 16, 2014, it focuses on Bart's new 4th grade teacher (Willem Dafoe), who is a terrible bully, so Bart schemes to bring him down.

Plot
The Springfield school district holds its annual "Dance of the Lemons," in which each school chooses its worst tenured teacher to be randomly reassigned to another campus. Springfield Elementary School receives Jack Lassen, who is put in charge of Bart's class. Having deliberately cut his cheek to give himself an intimidating scar, Lassen bullies Nelson and gives Bart an embarrassing haircut. Bart schemes to bring him down with help from Milhouse. Using a fake social network profile under Miss Hoover's name, they discover that Lassen has been chosen to ignite the eponymous effigy at the year's "Blazing Guy" desert festival.

Meanwhile, the Simpsons have planned to go camping at a site that requires reservations a year in advance. Homer has forgotten to book a spot, upsetting Marge, but Bart solves both of their problems by suggesting that they attend Blazing Guy instead. At the festival, Marge drinks a cup of tea provided by a fellow attendee in order to relax, not knowing that it contains hallucinogens which cause a prolonged delirium. Bart and Milhouse spray the effigy with fire-retardant chemicals to prevent Lassen from being able to light it, ruining his important moment. The boys climb the effigy to keep clear of an enraged Lassen as he blows fire at them from a burning tuba. Homer tries to save them by launching himself from a catapult, but instead hits the effigy's leg and triggers its collapse. Lassen is shunned by the festival crowd, while Bart and Milhouse escape safely. The Simpsons start for home but inadvertently forget Marge, who finds herself alone in the desert and the festival long over once the effects of the tea finally wear off.

Upon learning of Lassen's behavior at the festival, Superintendent Chalmers and Principal Skinner fire him. Lassen gets a new job as a prison guard and soon makes the acquaintance of inmate Sideshow Bob. The two begin making plans to kill Bart, having discovered their mutual hatred of him, but Bob rejects the deal after Lassen suggests that they share the actual kill.

Reception
The episode received an audience of 6.70 million, making it the most watched show on Fox that night.

Dennis Perkins of The A.V. Club gave the episode a B−, commenting that Lassen "fell flat" because Dafoe's reputation as a menacing actor comes from his physicality rather than his voice. He also observed that the series increasingly used Bart's misbehavior for jokes and plot development rather than emotional impact, but that this episode featured “classic Milhouse" moments in the episode, including  urinating himself on Lassen's entrance and joining in with Lassen in bullying Nelson.

References

External links 
 
 "Blazed and Confused" at theSimpsons.com

2014 American television episodes
The Simpsons (season 26) episodes
Television episodes about bullying
Burning Man
Television episodes about vacationing
Television episodes written by Carolyn Omine